Uibujärve  is a village in Põlva Parish, Põlva County in southeastern Estonia.

References

 

Villages in Põlva County